Farmers Grove is a ghost town in the town of York, Green County Wisconsin, United States.

Notable people
Elisha T. Gardner, Wisconsin lawyer, legislator, and businessman, owned a store in Farmers Grove.

Notes

Geography of Green County, Wisconsin
Ghost towns in Wisconsin